Joshua Wayne Parisian (born June 28, 1989) is an American mixed martial artist who competes in the heavyweight division of the UFC.

Background
Parisian grew up in Escanaba, Michigan, before moving from Martinsburg, West Virginia before the second grade. Because of an abusive stepfather – who eventually got jail time for domestic violence – he and his mother stayed a lot in shelters. He graduated from Escanaba Senior High School before attending Bay College for two years. In college, Parisian listened to his classmate's public speaking class speech on UFC and got interested in the sport. He tried it out and felt it improve his self-esteem and confidence, leading to dropping out of college in pursuit of a career in mixed martial arts.

Mixed martial arts career

Dana White's Contender Series
Racking up a record of 7–2 in the United States regional circuit before being invited to the Dana White's Contender Series. He faced Greg Rebello at Dana White's Contender Series 30 on June 26, 2018. Despite scoring a first-round knockout win, Parisian was not offered a UFC contract directly, but a spot in The Ultimate Fighter: Heavy Hitters.

The Ultimate Fighter: Heavy Hitters
In the fifth episode of the season, Parisian faced Michel Batista in a quarter-final bout. He lost the fight via second-round technical knockout and was eliminated from the tournament.

Return to Contender Series
After The Ultimate Fighter, Parisian returned to the regional circuit where he lost the first bout then went on a five-bout winning streak and earned another shot in Dana White's Contender Series. He faced Chad Johnson at Season 4 Week 3 on August 18, 2020. He scored a first-round knockout victory once again and was awarded a UFC contract.

Ultimate Fighting Championship
Parisian made his UFC debut against Parker Porter on November 28, 2020 at UFC on ESPN: Smith vs. Clark. He lost the bout by unanimous decision.

In his sophomore appearance in the promotion, Parisian faced Roque Martinez at UFC on ESPN: The Korean Zombie vs. Ige on June 19, 2021. He won the bout via controversial split decision. 12 out of 14 media scores gave the victory to Martinez.

Parisian faced Don'Tale Mayes on December 18, 2021 at UFC Fight Night: Lewis vs. Daukaus. He lost the bout via TKO due to elbows from crucifix position in the third round.

Parisian faced Alan Baudot on June 25, 2022 at UFC on ESPN 38. After being dropped in the first round, Parisian rebounded to win the fight via technical knockout in the second round. This win earned him his first Performance of the Night bonus award.

Parisian was scheduled to face Chase Sherman on November 5, 2022 at UFC Fight Night 214. However, Parisian pulled out of the fight hours before it was to take place due to medical issues.

Parisian faced Jamal Pogues on February 18, 2023, at UFC Fight Night 219. He lost the fight via unanimous decision.

Personal life
Parisian and his fiancée have a daughter, Eva (born 2020).

Championships and accomplishments

Mixed martial arts
 Carlos Llinas International Productions
CLIP Heavyweight Championship (One time)
Ultimate Fighting Championship
Performance of the Night (One time)

Mixed martial arts record

|-
|Loss
|align=center|15–6
|Jamal Pogues
|Decision (unanimous)
|UFC Fight Night: Andrade vs. Blanchfield
|
|align=center|3
|align=center|5:00
|Las Vegas, Nevada, United States
|
|-
|Win
|align=center|15–5
|Alan Baudot
|TKO (punches)
|UFC on ESPN: Tsarukyan vs. Gamrot
|
|align=center|2
|align=center|3:04
|Las Vegas, Nevada, United States
|
|-
|Loss
|align=center|14–5
|Don'Tale Mayes
|TKO (elbows)
|UFC Fight Night: Lewis vs. Daukaus
|
|align=center|3
|align=center|3:26
|Las Vegas, Nevada, United States
|
|-
|Win
|align=center|14–4
|Roque Martinez
|Decision (split)
|UFC on ESPN: The Korean Zombie vs. Ige
|
|align=center|3
|align=center|5:00
|Las Vegas, Nevada, United States
|
|-
|Loss
|align=center|13–4
|Parker Porter
|Decision (unanimous)
|UFC on ESPN: Smith vs. Clark
|
|align=center|3
|align=center|5:00
|Las Vegas, Nevada, United States
|
|-
|Win
|align=center|13–3
|Chad Johnson
|KO (punches)
|Dana White's Contender Series 30
|
|align=center|1
|align=center|3:43
|Las Vegas, Nevada, United States
|
|-
|Win
|align=center|12–3
|Marcus Maulding
|TKO (punches)
|WXC 86: Warrior Wednesday 11
|
|align=center|1
|align=center|3:57
|Southgate, Michigan, United States
|
|-
|Win
|align=center|11–3
|Matunga Djikasa
|TKO (punches)
|ARES FC 1
|
|align=center|2
|align=center|4:16
|Dakar, Senegal
|
|-
| Win
| align=center| 10–3
| Charles Brown
| TKO (punches)
| CLIP: Motor City Cagefights 7
| 
| align=center|1
| align=center|1:55
| Detroit, Michigan, United States
|
|-
| Win
| align=center| 9–3
| Victor Jones
| TKO (submission to punches)
| Smuggler's: Rumble on the River
| 
| align=center| 2
| align=center| 2:16
| Wyandotte, Michigan, United States
|
|-
| Win
| align=center|8–3
| Alejandro Santiago
|TKO (punches)
|NATO: Extreme Warriors 2
|
|align=center|1
|align=center|4:41
|Mt. Pleasant, Michigan, United States
| 
|-
| Loss
| align=center|7–3
| Brett Martin
| Submission (kimura)
|Lights Out Championship 2
|
| align=center|1
| align=center|1:08
|Grand Rapids, Michigan, United States
|
|-
| Win
| align=center|7–2
| Greg Rebello
| KO (spinning backfist)
|Dana White's Contender Series 11
|
|align=center|1
|align=center|1:31
|Las Vegas, Nevada, United States
| 
|-
| Win
| align=center|6–2
| Zach Thumb
| TKO (punches)
|LFA 38
|
|align=center|1
|align=center|2:39
|Minneapolis, United States
| 
|-
| Loss
| align=center| 5–2
| Tony Lopez
|TKO (punches)
|KOTC: Supremacy
|
|align=center| 2
|align=center| 3:27
|Wyandotte, Michigan, United States
|
|-
| Win
| align=center|5–1
| Nathan Bryant
| Decision (majority)
| Caged Power 11
| 
| align=center| 3
| align=center| 5:00
| Morgantown, West Virginia, United States
|
|-
| Win
| align=center| 4–1
| Josh Burns
|TKO (punches)
|TWC Pro Series: Anderson vs. Veerella
|
|align=center|2
|align=center|1:50
|Lansing, Michigan, United States
| 
|-
| Win
| align=center| 3–1
| Anthony Coleman
| Submission (triangle choke)
| Dual Combat Sports 5
| 
| align=center|2
| align=center|1:18
| Detroit, Michigan, United States
|
|-
| Win
| align=center|2–1
| Rasheed Oruche
|Submission (keylock)
|Total Warrior Combat 28
|
| align=center|2
| align=center|2:03
|Lansing, Michigan, United States
|
|-
| Loss
| align=center| 1–1
| Ryan Pokryfky
| Decision (unanimous)
|Total Warrior Combat 27
|
| align=center|3
| align=center|5:00
|Lansing, Michigan, United States
|
|-
| Win
| align=center|1–0
| Destin Allen
| TKO (punches)
|Total Warrior Combat 26
|
|align=center|1
|align=center|2:25
|Lansing, Michigan, United States
|

See also 

 List of current UFC fighters
List of male mixed martial artists

References

External links 
  
 

Living people
1989 births
American male mixed martial artists
Heavyweight mixed martial artists
Ultimate Fighting Championship male fighters